This article contains a list of tripoints of English counties. A tripoint is the point at which three geographical regions meet.

Ceremonial county tripoints

The table contains a list of the 68 tripoints for the ceremonial counties of England as per the Lieutenancies Act 1997, as amended. Also included are the three points at which two counties meet the borders with Wales and Scotland. For each tripoint the counties are ordered with the first alphabetically given first, and the counties listed anti-clockwise around the point from there.

As a result of the Local Government Act 1972, between 1974 and 1996 the counties of Avon and Cleveland had three tripoints that are no longer in existence.

Historic county tripoints

The table contains a list of the 58 principal tripoints for the historic counties of England prior to 1800. As the English county boundaries had remained essentially unchanged since the eleventh century, the list can thus be seen to represent the "original" locations of the English county tripoints.

During the nineteenth century a number of laws, most notably the Counties Act of 1844, resulted in the relocation of some sections of historic boundaries, principally to remove detached portions of counties. With the notable exception of the creation of the metropolitan counties in 1974, the majority of the boundaries have remained unchanged since then. For comparison the locations of the tripoints in 1890 are also listed in the table, by which time the majority of the localised changes had been made. The handful of additional tripoints that were formed by detached parts of counties are not listed in the table (e.g. Devon(detached)-Dorset-Somerset, Staffordshire-Shropshire(detached)-Worcestershire(detached)).

The symbol (†) indicates that the original point still exists unchanged as a tripoint of the current ceremonial counties. (Many of the other points still exist as the meeting of three administrative districts.) For each tripoint the counties are ordered with the first alphabetically given first, and the counties listed anti-clockwise around the point from there.

See also
List of tripoints
Three Shire Stone (disambiguation)
Bassetts Pole

References

Tripoints
Tripoints
Tripoints in England
England